Heyns is a surname. Notable people with the surname include:

Christof Heyns (1959–2021), South African legal scholar
Jan Heyns (died 1516), Dutch architect
Johan Heyns (1928–1994), South African theologian
Michiel Heyns (born 1943), South African writer, translator and academic
Penelope Heyns (born 1974), South African swimmer

See also
Heyn

Afrikaans-language surnames
Surnames of Dutch origin